Pedro Manolo Rodas Steeg (born 4 July 1996) is a German footballer who plays as a midfielder for Kickers Offenbach.

Personal life
Rodoas was born in the Elgersweier district of Offenburg, Baden-Württemberg to an Ecuadorian father.

References

External links
 Profile at DFB.de
 Profile at FuPa.net
 

1996 births
Living people
People from Offenburg
Sportspeople from Freiburg (region)
Footballers from Baden-Württemberg
German footballers
Germany youth international footballers
Association football midfielders
SC Freiburg II players
FSV Zwickau players
Kickers Offenbach players
3. Liga players
Regionalliga players